Edisto Island Baptist Church is a historic African-American Baptist church on Edisto Island in Charleston County, South Carolina. Built in 1818, it is a two-story church sheathed in beaded weatherboard with a medium pitched gable roof. An addition doubling its size was completed about 1865, and a two-story pedimented portico was added in 1880.

It was added to the National Register of Historic Places in 1982.

References

African-American history of South Carolina
Baptist churches in South Carolina
Churches on the National Register of Historic Places in South Carolina
Churches completed in 1818
Churches in Charleston County, South Carolina
National Register of Historic Places in Charleston County, South Carolina